Madia is a genus of annual or perennial usually aromatic herbs with yellow flowers, in the tribe Madieae within the family Asteraceae.

They are sometimes known as tarweeds. The species in this genus are native to western North America and southwestern South America. The name Madia is derived from native Chilean name ("Madi") for one of the members of the genus (Madia sativa).

 Species
 Madia anomala Greene  - plumpseeded madia - northern CA 
 Madia chilensis (Nutt.) Reiche - central Chile
 Madia citrigracilis D.D.Keck - Shasta tarweed - northern CA 
 Madia citriodora Greene - lemon-scented madia - northern CA, NV, OR, WA, ID 
 Madia elegans D.Don ex Lindl. - common madia  - northern CA, NV, OR, WA 
 Madia exigua (Sm.) A.Gray - small tarweed - CA OR WA NV ID MT BC, Baja California
 Madia glomerata Hook. - mountain tarweed - mountains of western United States; scattered locales in Canada and in north-central + northeastern United States
 Madia gracilis (Sm. ex Sm.) D.D.Keck - grassy tarweed - CA OR WA NV ID UT MT BC 
 Madia radiata Kellogg - golden madia - CA 
 Madia sativa Molina - coast tarweed - CA OR WA NV ID BC; scattered populations in eastern Canada + northeastern United States; southern Argentina, southern Chile
 Madia subspicata  D.D.Keck - slender tarweed - CA

 formerly included
see Anisocarpus Harmonia Jensia Kyhosia 
 Madia bolanderi - Kyhosia bolanderi
 Madia doris-nilesiae  - Harmonia doris-nilesiae
 Madia hallii  - Harmonia hallii
 Madia madioides  - Anisocarpus madioides
 Madia minima  - Hemizonella minima
 Madia nutans  - Harmonia nutans
 Madia stebbinsii  - Harmonia stebbinsii
 Madia yosemitana  - Jensia yosemitana

References

External links

 USDA Plants Profile for Madia (tarweed)
 U.H.Botany: Asteraceae; Heliantheae-Madiinae; Madia — Gerald Carr's site at the University of Hawaii. 
 
 Jepson Manual treatment: Madia
 Madia — U.C. Photos Gallery
 

 
Asteraceae genera